Enteromius kuiluensis is a species of ray-finned fish in the genus Enteromius. It is a freshwater fish that is found in Africa. Enteromius kuiluensis has been found only in the Niari-Kouilou basin in the Republic of Congo.

References

 

Endemic fauna of the Republic of the Congo
Enteromius
Fish described in 1930
Taxa named by Jacques Pellegrin